Los Pozos   is a town and corregimiento in Los Pozos District, Herrera Province, Panama with a population of 2,199 as of 2010. It is the seat of Los Pozos District. Its population as of 1990 was 2,139; its population as of 2000 was 2,268.

References

Corregimientos of Herrera Province
Populated places in Herrera Province